Marusha Aphrodite Gleiß (born 18 November 1966), known by her stage name Marusha, is a German-Greek electronic music disc jockey, producer and television presenter who had hits in the mid-1990s including her 1994 single "Somewhere Over the Rainbow".

Career 
Marusha was born in Nuremberg. She started as a radio disc jockey in 1991 with her weekly show "Dancehall" on Berlin station DT64. When the station closed she moved to Fritz, another Berlin radio station, and presented a weekly slot called "Rave Satellite" until 2007. In 2007 she was also a member of the jury in the German version of Popstars.

From 1993 to 1996 Marusha presented a television dance music show called "Feuerreiter" for regional broadcaster ORB, which later aired nationally via ARD.

Scooter mentions Marusha in their 1994 song Hyper Hyper, during which lead singer H.P. Baxxter reads out the name of numerous DJs.

Discography 

Singles

Albums
 1994 Raveland (Ger #4)
 1995 Wir (Ger #81)
 1998 No Hide No Run (Ger #94)
 2002 Nonstop (Mix-CD)
 2004 Offbeat
 2007 Heat
 2012 Club Arrest
 2018 Rave Satellite
 
Compilations
 Marusha · jackfruit)))_LAVA_ping pong productions_berlin
 Jumpstart – September 2000
 Touch Base (as Maru) – Jan 2001
 Chimes (as Maru) – Jan 2001
 Were here (as Maru) – September 2001
 Snow In July – Oct 2002
 Cha Cha Maharadsha – May 2003

Compilations
 Rave Channel, Mayday – A New Chapter Of House And Techno `92
 Whatever Turns You On Mayday – The Judgement Day 1993
 Cardinal Points Of Life, Mayday – Rave Olympia 1994
 Impressive Collective, Mayday – Reformation 1995
 Merlin, Mayday – The Great Coalition 1995
 Bewegungsapparat, Mayday – Mayday X 1996
 Everybody Electrojack, Mayday – Life On Mars 1996
 Check Dis Out, Love Parade Let The Sun Shine In Your Heart `97
 Ravechannel Loveparade 2000

Remixes
 Suspicious Lovewaves 1994
 WestBam – Liberation 1994
 Yves de Ruyter – Yvesday 1995
 Tom Novy – I House You 1997
 Bee Gees – World 1998
 Söhne Mannheims – Dein Glück 2001 Trip To Asia (Movie) – Temple Remix 2007

References

External links

Official website

1966 births
Club DJs
Electronic dance music DJs
Women DJs
German dance musicians
German DJs
German house musicians
German people of Greek descent
German techno musicians
Eurodance musicians
Echo (music award) winners
German trance musicians
Happy hardcore musicians
Hardcore techno musicians
Women in electronic music
Living people
Musicians from Nuremberg